Frederick John Widgery (May 1861 – 27 January 1942), was an English artist who painted landscapes and coastal scenery in Devon and Cornwall.

Frederick was the younger son of William Widgery (1826–1893), a self-taught artist. He studied at the Exeter School of Art and went on to the South Kensington Museum School and then to Antwerp, studying under Charles Verlat at the National Art School. Returning to England, he studied at Hubert von Herkomer's School at Bushey in Hertfordshire and in 1903 became Mayor of Exeter. Frederick's sister, Julia (Widgery) Slaughter, was also a portrait and landscape painter.

References

External links
 
 

1861 births
1942 deaths
19th-century English painters
English male painters
20th-century English painters
English watercolourists
Mayors of Exeter
20th-century English male artists
19th-century English male artists